Kronos was a death metal band from France. Their name is a reference to the titan Cronus, the father of Zeus in greek mythology.

Lyrical subjects
The lyrics of their songs are mainly about myths, legends and historical subjects from the ancient civilizations of Rome, Greece and Egypt or from Scandinavia or even from old kingdoms belonging to barbarians.

History 
Kronos was formed in 1994 in Thaon-les-Vosges (France) by Grams (14 years old), Marot (17 years old), Jeremy (17 years old) and Mike (13 years old). The band played at this point heavy/thrash metal. Two years later Tems (19 years old) replaced Marot (guitar) and Kristof (18 years old) joined the band for the vocals. Kronos started then to play death metal and recorded its first demo called Outrance. 
In 1999, Tom (20 years old) replaced Jéremy and the band oriented towards brutal death metal. The following year the recording of a new demo Split Promo 2000 containing 4 titles was finalised.

Their first album Titan's Awakening was released in 2001. This first edition of this album was produced by the band itself. The band was then acclaimed by critics and got its first contract with the label Warpath Records (former Shockwave). A new edition of Titan's Awakening was released at the end of October the same year with a new cover designed by Deather (Angel Corpse, Gurkkhas, Vital Remains) as well as a new graphical booklet.
Richard (26 years old) replaced Tems and plays the lead guitar from 2003. The band signed a contract for two upcoming albums with the Spanish label Xtreem music managed by Dave Rotten from the band Avulsed.
The second album was released in 2004 and is named Colossal Titan Strife. The band toured Europe in 2005 promoting the album. 
The third album was released in April 2007 and is named The Hellenic Terror.

Members

Current members 
Jérôme "Grams" Grammaire - guitar (1994-2017) vocals (1994-1996)
Tom Viel - bass, vocals (1999-2017)
Richard "Ricardo" Chuat - guitar (2003-2017)
Trivette - vocals (2013-2017)
Anthony Reyboz - drums (2014-2017)

Previous members 
Marot - guitar (1994-1996)
Jeremy Siaux - bass (1994-1999)
Michaël "Mike Sako" Saccoman - drums (1994-2012)
Nicolas "Tems" Temmar - guitar (1996-2003)
Christophe "Kristof" Gérardin - vocals (1996-2009)
Quentin Regnault - drums (2012-2013)

Discography

Studio releases
 Titan's Awakening (2001)
 Colossal Titan Strife (2004)
 The Hellenic Terror (2007)
 Arisen New Era (2015)

Compilations 
 Prelude To Awakening (2009)

Demos 
 Outrance (tape) (1994)
 Split Promo 2000 with None Divine (2000)

External links 

 
 Kronos at Encyclopaedia Metallum

French death metal musical groups
Musical groups established in 1994
Musical quartets
1994 establishments in France